When authorities from the United States (U.S.) began scouring the globe looking for the location of Osama bin Laden following the September 11 attacks in 2001, there were a number of alleged sightings of Bin Laden in the U.S.

Although some scholars believe that bin Laden took his new wife to visit the cities of Indianapolis and Los Angeles in 1978, all later suggestions of bin Laden entering the U.S. were typically treated by authorities with skepticism, but were followed up at least cursorily. In actuality, although many analysts believed he was hiding in Pakistan, there were no confirmed sightings of bin Laden from December 2001 to May 2011. Lt. Charles Illsley of the West Valley City Police said that "When, day after day, media reports focus on a single person like Bundy or bin Laden, it is not too big a leap for somebody to go outside and think they see him. Images stick."

All of these sightings were dismissed when bin Laden was confirmed dead after a U.S. raid in Pakistan on May 1, 2011.

Reported sightings
In the immediate investigation surrounding the attacks, FBI agent Brian Rielly canvassed an apartment block to inquire about Osama Awadallah, and were told by a woman that she had seen Osama bin Laden himself sharing an apartment with the 21-year-old student who was later acquitted.

In October 2001, a woman, sounding "very well-meaning and serious about her concern", told emergency dispatchers that she had encountered bin Laden at a 7-Eleven convenience store in Pleasant View, Utah.

On December 17, 2001, a man in Colorado Springs, Colorado informed authorities that he had seen bin Laden attending a Rotary Club event earlier in the day.

In May 2002, a caller phoned police in San Mateo, California, to report that they had just seen Osama bin Laden hanging around the Caltrain station.

Several dozen people had reported seeing bin Laden in Utah; driving a Volkswagen Beetle on I-80, in the mall, at McDonald's, or in a Provo 7-Eleven purchasing a Big Gulp by January 2002. Predominantly a Mormon state, this urban legend relies on the tenuous permittance of plural marriage in Utah, and its generally arid climate, to justify why the leader of al-Qaeda would choose it as his hiding place. In response to the claims, Utah authorities told media that Bin Laden's face had been one of those loaded into a facial recognition program for surveillance cameras at the E Center arena, expected to host the Olympic hockey tournament in 2002.

In June 2007, the unemployed Thomas Potter of Olmsted Falls, Ohio, wrote to the Department of Defense, as well as the media, requesting the $25 million reward for finding bin Laden, noting that WhitePages.com had three listings for the shadowy leader; one that suggested he worked at Fox News, another suggesting he worked at Bethesda Interactive Solutions, and a third suggesting he lived in Hermitage, Tennessee.

In February 2008, a woman reported to police that she had seen Osama bin Laden at the library in Bellingham, Washington.

In November 2022, reports emerged that two individuals had allegedly spotted a person resembling Osama bin Laden on Google Maps. According to the reports, the individual was seen walking under a bridge located at 5450 Rosa Parks Boulevard in Detroit, Michigan, and appeared to stay in the same location for multiple scenes captured by the Google Maps van. An AI algorithm was reportedly used to verify that the individual seen in the images was the same person throughout the captured scenes. After the reports surfaced, local authorities were contacted to investigate the matter, but the individual has not been located as of yet.

Parodies
In December 2001, The New Yorker magazine carried a satirical list of leads that the FBI had followed up since the attacks, noting "#6: Lady in Denver claims she saw Osama bin Laden driving off the fifth tee at her country club."

When a remote Alaskan fishing village, with a total population of only 2,400 residents, received more than $200,000 in federal Homeland Security funds to install surveillance cameras in 2005, it led to jokes about Osama bin Laden hiding in the village.

In August 2005, a frustrated resident of York, Pennsylvania, told the local newspaper that he had seen bin Laden disappear in the tall weeds around Willis Run, and suggested tongue-in-cheek that perhaps the Department of Homeland Security should finally come take care of the county's weed problem.

References

Allegations
Sightings in the United States
Urban legends